Upper Tyrone may refer to:

Upper Tyrone Township, Fayette County, Pennsylvania, United States
County of Upper Tyrone, former county in Ireland